Spring Valley School is a secondary school located on the campus of the National Institute of Technology Calicut at  Chathamangalam in Kerala. The school is affiliated to the Central Board of Secondary Education. 
 
School is functioning in the space earmarked by the National Institute of Technology Calicut and is being promoted as a staff welfare measure of the institute and the Department of Electronics and Accreditation of Computer Classes centre in Kozhikode.

Campus
The Spring Valley School is a senior secondary, co-educational, English medium school functioning in the National Institute of Technology Calicut campus since 1992. The school is affiliated to the Central Board of Secondary Education, New Delhi.  It is managed by National Institute of Technology Calicut Spectra, a charitable society registered under the Societies Act (1860).  The members of the society are the faculty members of National Institute of Technology Calicut.  The sole objective of the society is to run the school.

Academics 
At the primary level, classes I through IV- children are engaged to acquire knowledge and the teacher functions as a guide and facilitator in the process. They are introduced to social norms and moral values through instructions and indoor/outdoor activities. Attempts are made to identify the talents in them and training is given to develop these. Drawing, painting, dance, music, elocution, storytelling, recitation, writing, dramatics, display drills, sports and games are the skill areas. Science projects, creative writing, clay modeling, craft work etc. form an important part of the activities at this level. These are aimed at developing the creativity in children.

The classroom instructions involve mostly interactive works to develop the children's communication abilities. This forms the core of the educational process at this level and hence special efforts are made to develop the four language skills of learning, speaking, reading and writing.

In the middle school section – classes fifth through eighth – scope is progressively widened and greater emphasis is given to self learning, logical thinking, analyzing and arriving at correct inferences by the children.
 
In the high school section – classes IXth and Xth – greater emphasis is given to acquire proficiency in specific subject areas. Development of higher cognitive skills is also emphasized.

In the senior secondary section- Plus 2 classes- The children are elevated to further heights by narrowing down to specific fields and thrusting on the foundations for further higher studies to professional and non professional levels.

Achievements 
The institution has been able to maintain the track record of academic excellence by securing 100 percent results in the CBSE X examination for the past 8 years. The school was awarded the Sahodaya Award of Excellence for the cent percent result in the All India Secondary School Examination, and many students of this school have secured ranks ranging from 1 to 15 throughout the years. Even under the changed Evaluation system the students have exhibited spectacular performance by securing A+ and A grades.

Besides academic excellence, the school continues to shine in the CBSE Kalotsav conducted by Malabar Sahodaya Complex, from the district to the state level. The students have also won prizes in various Quiz Competitions at the District/State/National level which was commendable.

During the first decade of existence since 1992, the children had brought many laurels to the school and the same stands as the proof of commitment of the school to its objectives. Even though the school is situated away from the city with no hostel facilities for the students, the challenges of keeping the moral high and maintaining high academic standards have been met to the greatest extent possible.

External links 
 Spring Valley School

Central Board of Secondary Education